Edward Rowlands  (1826 – 1860) was an Australian cricketer. He played one first-class cricket match for Victoria in 1854.

See also
 List of Victoria first-class cricketers

References

1826 births
1860 deaths
Australian cricketers
Victoria cricketers
Sportspeople from Worcestershire
Melbourne Cricket Club cricketers